The 1904 United States presidential election in Maryland took place on November 8, 1904. All contemporary 45 states were part of the 1904 United States presidential election. State voters chose eight electors to the Electoral College, which selected the president and vice president.

The winner in Maryland depended on the votes, supposedly due to the “Wilson Law” designed to make it easier for Democrats to cast ballots for both Presidential electors and Congress by a simple turning down of a single fold in the ballot paper. Seven electoral votes were won by the Democratic nominees, Chief Judge Alton B. Parker of New York and his running mate Henry G. Davis of West Virginia, while the Republican nominees, President Theodore Roosevelt of New York and his running mate Charles W. Fairbanks of Indiana, won the popular vote and one electoral vote. Roosevelt’s popular vote margin is the second-closest presidential election margin by number of votes on record, behind Henry Clay's four-vote 1832 win, also in Maryland. In this election, Maryland voted 18.81% more Democratic than the nation at-large.

As of 2020, this marks the last time both Baltimore City and Baltimore County voted for a candidate that lost the state.

Results

Results by county

Counties that flipped from Republican to Democratic
Anne Arundel
Baltimore (County)
Baltimore (City)
Caroline
Carroll
Kent
St. Mary's
Talbot

See also
 United States presidential elections in Maryland
 1904 United States presidential election
 1904 United States elections

Notes

References 

Maryland
1904
Presidential